The Shockley diode (named after physicist William Shockley) is a four-layer semiconductor diode, which were one of the first semiconductor devices invented. It is a PNPN diode, with alternating layers of P-type and N-type material. It is equivalent to a thyristor with a disconnected gate. Shockley diodes were manufactured and marketed by Shockley Semiconductor Laboratory in the late 1950s. The Shockley diode has a negative resistance characteristic. It was largely superseded by the diac.

Working 

Unlike other semiconductor diodes, the Shockley diode has more than one PN junction. The construction includes four sections of semiconductors placed alternately between the anode and cathode in the pattern of PNPN. Though it has multiple junctions, it is termed a diode for being a two-terminal device.

The Shockley diode remains in an OFF state, with a very high resistance, until a voltage greater than the trigger voltage is applied across its terminals. When the voltage exceeds the trigger value, the resistance drops to an extremely low value and the device switches ON. The constituent transistors help in maintaining the ON and OFF states. As the construction resembles a pair of interconnected bipolar transistors, one PNP and other NPN, neither transistor can turn ON until the other is turned ON due to the absence of any current through the base-emitter junction. Once sufficient voltage is applied and one of the transistors breaks down, it starts conducting and allows base current to flow through the other transistor, resulting in saturation of both the transistors, keeping both in ON state.

On reducing the voltage to a sufficiently low level, the current flowing becomes insufficient to maintain the transistor bias. Due to insufficient current, one of the transistors will cut off, interrupting the base current to the other transistor, hence sealing both transistors in the OFF state.

Usages 
Common applications:
 Trigger switch for silicon controlled rectifier
 Relaxation oscillator / sawtooth oscillator

Niche applications:
 Audio amplifier

Typical values

Dynistor 

Small-signal Shockley diodes are no longer manufactured, but the unidirectional thyristor breakover diode, also known as the dynistor, is a functionally equivalent power device. An early publication about dynistors was published in 1958. In 1988 the first dynistor using silicon carbide was made. Dynistors can be used as switches in micro- and nanosecond power pulse generators.

References 
 Michael Riordan and Lillian Hoddeson; Crystal Fire: The Invention of the Transistor and the Birth of the Information Age. New York: Norton (1997)  pbk.

External links 

 Shockley diode analysis
 Shockley diode information
Transistor Diodes, by Shockley himself (Jan. 1960)

Diodes
Solid state switches